The netball competitions at the 2019 Southeast Asian Games in the Philippines were held from 25 November to 2 December 2019 at Santa Rosa Sports Complex in Santa Rosa, Laguna.

Competition schedule
The following is the competition schedule for the netball competitions:

Squads

Results

All times are Philippine Standard Time (UTC+08:00)

Preliminary round

Final round

Semi-finals

Gold medal match

Medal summary

Medalists

References

External links
 

2019 Southeast Asian Games events
Southeast Asian Games
Netball at the Southeast Asian Games
International sports competitions hosted by the Philippines